The Abbeville Red Sox were a Minor League Baseball team based in Abbeville, Alabama, that played in the Alabama–Florida League in 1936.  They were managed by former major leaguer, Monroe Mitchell.  The team wore red stirrups. They disbanded on August 10 in their only season of existence.

References

External links
 Baseball Reference

Baseball teams established in 1936
Defunct minor league baseball teams
Professional baseball teams in Alabama
Defunct Alabama-Florida League teams
Baseball teams disestablished in 1936
1936 establishments in Alabama
1936 disestablishments in Alabama
Defunct baseball teams in Alabama